Park Moon-sung (born April 22, 1974) is a South Korean sports commentator. He is the commentator for the FIFA Online 3.

Filmography

Variety shows

References

External links 

 

1974 births
Living people
South Korean association football commentators
Soongsil University alumni